Saif ed-Din Bokharzi & Bayan-Quli Khan Mausoleums are mausoleums dedicated to Saif ed-Din Bokharzi, a Khorasani sheikh, and Bayan-Quli Khan, the Chagatay ruler. They are located in the settlement called Fathabad, to the east from medieval Bukhara, in the past was situated vast religious complex. The initial core of the complex was the grave of Saif ed-Din al-Boharsi. The followers of the sheikh al-Boharsi have built up at this area of rabad ("rabad" – an outskirt) many dormitories (khanakas) for dervishes, who lived there on donations of the Kubrawiya Sufi order members. The Fathabad settlement later had joined the city. The Chagatay ruler Bayan-Quli Khan had expressed a wish to be interred near by respected burial place of al-Boharsi, and it is there that he is buried. In 1358, the Mausoleum of Bayan-Quli Khan had appeared there.

The extant mausoleum of Saif ed-Din Boharsi dates from the end of the 14th century. The Saif ed-Din al-Boharsi Mausoleum together with the Bayan-Quli Khan Mausoleum are an admirable architectural ensemble. However, these monuments make even more great interest because of their religious-historical and cultural importance.

History 

After al-Boharsi's death – in 1261 (by some sources in 1262) – the khanaka, erected near to the Al-Boharsi grave, became the center of Kubravi order in Bukhara. There dervishes and pilgrims could find shelter, food, clothes, footwear and so on. Sometimes, more than 100 dervishes could eat there. Besides donations, another source of necessary funds was a big land property (about 100 km² to the south of Qarshi Gates of Bukhara), which belonged to the order.

Construction of first building of mausoleum above the grave of "Sheikh of peace" was finished at the beginning of the 14th century. This building was not remained to our time. The last building of mausoleum adorns Bukhara city since the second part of 14th century, and its imposing intake portal was built even later.

The mausoleum attracts by its mighty shapes, excellent simplicity and clarity of an architectural idea. It is possible to see an evolution of architectural theme when comparing this mausoleum with intact Bukhara monument of 10th century. This Mausoleum is not unicameral burial-vault as the Samanid mausoleum. The design of building is more ingenious and consists of the burial-vault (purhana) and commemoration room (ziarathona). Two domes above these rooms organize building's side-view. The distinguishing feature of the Mausoleum is an absence of an inner and external decoration. In spite of this feature, an unknown architect achieved an impressive power of his building.

The Mausoleum of Saif ed-Din Boharsi is a vivid illustration of artisans' innovation, their self-perfection, and searching of new ideas. Here we can see technique of conversion from square foundation of ziarathona to octahedral and then to hexahedral shapes. This technique was accomplished using stalactite "sails". There are small windows in the hexahedral part; soft sunlight shines through them. Above it – a cap of the dome, this concludes whole space.

Inside the mausoleum, in gurhana room, there is rich picturesque element – splendid tomb of Saif ed-Din Boharsi. The tomb represents the combination of refined multipronged pictures, complicated interlacement of crockets and intricate Arabic characters. It is a genuine masterpiece of the medieval wooden engraving.

In the course of time the bricks of mausoleum began to crumble. During the restoration in the 1960s, the monument roof and walls were slightly strengthened. In spite of that, the earthquake in 1976 badly damaged the building.

In Soviet time, the group of restorers from "Special scientific institute of monuments restoration/conservation of Uzbek SSR" under the direction of architect A. Bogoduhov and engineer Y. Golshtein had accomplished full restoration of the Mausoleum according with the project of its strengthening and restoration. The State had appropriated for this purpose 118 thousand soviet rubles.

See also
 Samanid mausoleum
 Lyab-i Khauz
 Mausoleum of Sheikh Zaynudin
 Po-i-Kalyan
 Tourism in Uzbekistan

References
 Dmitriy Page. Saif ed-Din Bokharzi & Bayan-Quli Khan Mausoleums

Mausoleums in Uzbekistan
Buildings and structures in Bukhara